The Beast is an American crime drama series starring Patrick Swayze and Travis Fimmel. The series, which only ran for one season, debuted on A&E Network. It was Swayze's final acting performance before his death in 2009. Despite receiving largely positive reviews from critics, it garnered low Nielsen ratings and was cancelled in early June 2009.

Plot
Set in Chicago, veteran middle-aged FBI agent Charles Barker applies controversial techniques in his attempts to bring criminals to justice, which often border on illegal and unsettle his uninitiated rookie partner, Ellis Dove. Over the course of the first season, Barker is investigated by fellow FBI agents for alleged misconduct. Dove's loyalty to his partner is challenged when FBI internal affairs agent Ray Beaumont (Larry Gilliard) approaches him to gain information. Shortly thereafter, Dove learns of darker secrets in Barker's past.

Characters 
 Charles Barker (Patrick Swayze) is a veteran FBI agent, and an expert at going undercover, gaining the confidence of criminals and setting them up for a long hard fall in prison. As skilled an actor as he is a cop, Barker has taken a rookie agent—Ellis Dove—under his wing. Barker acts as Ellis's acting coach, trainer, and mentor. Barker appears to be a patriot whose loyalty should go unquestioned, but his superiors think he has been seduced into criminal activity. In the pilot episode, it is revealed that he is fluent in Russian and that he is being investigated by the FBI.
 Ellis Dove (Travis Fimmel) is a rookie FBI agent and Charles Barker's trainee in the undercover trade. Under intense pressure from Barker to become a chameleon, Ellis never knows when Barker will send him on some impossible little test, some on-the-spot improv that may or may not cost him his life. Stressed, tense, and under impossible performance pressure, Ellis needs a break. However, that's not the worst of it; an Internal Affairs team is trying to recruit Ellis to spy on his mentor Barker.
 Harry Conrad (Kevin J O'Connor) is an FBI agent who appears to be Barker's handler at the FBI, and he's supervising Ellis as well. As a seasoned professional, he knows Barker well enough to speak to him in terse personal code—but for newbie Ellis, he needs to spell things out, including his deep respect for Barker's work.
 Rose Lawrence (Lindsay Pulsipher) is Ellis's neighbor, with whom he shares a romantic relationship. A law student, she is sharp enough to spot something odd about Ellis (who keeps his job a closely guarded secret) and takes the relationship slowly.
 Ray Beaumont (Larry Gilliard) is a fellow FBI Agent working for Internal Affairs who is investigating Charles Barker. Sly and sneaky in his ways, he attempts to use Ellis to get information to help make his case that Barker is dirty.

Episodes

Reception
Alan Sepinwall writes "... you watch Swayze in The Beast, and you realize that this is the best performance of his career—that the opportunity to play a part like this, and to play it as well as he is, may be fueling his ability to keep fighting against the cancer. And you realize, in an odd silver lining, that the cancer may, in turn, be fueling the performance". The New York Times reported that "Patrick Swayze's performance... is impressive for its resistance to cliché...".

Suzan Young of RealNetworks stated that, "Patrick Swayze gives the performance of a lifetime as the hard-edged FBI agent Charles Barker in A&E's The Beast".

In his review, Ray Richmond of The Hollywood Reporter stated that, "Beast has a far grittier feel and look than one would suspect from a show starring Swayze—not to mention one on A&E. The action often is energetic and intriguing but is sometimes brought down by Fimmel's uneven performance. …What's unmistakable is the killer work of the star. May the man somehow beat the odds and fight defiantly on".

Kelly West of Cinema Blend reported that, "For an original series, I think A&E has something great on their hands. The Beast is definitely drama series with an edge, showing the darker, grittier side to FBI undercover work".

Ken Tucker writes that the lines said by the "antihero" and main character "[were] old when Clint Eastwood was Dirty Harry". Tucker adds that the co-star (Travis Fimmel as Ellis Dove) gives "inexpressive line readings; he's here because he's young and pretty (Fimmel was a model), and he fits A&E's desired viewing demo. Ellis is the newbie who earns Barker's respect...".  Overall, Tucker grades the program as a "C".

Home media
Sony Pictures released the series on Region 1 DVD in the United States & region 2 in the UK on August 18, 2009.  This release has been discontinued and is out of print.

On February 16, 2016, Mill Creek Entertainment  re-released The Beast- The Complete Series on DVD in Region 1.

International broadcast
In the UK, the show was broadcast on the channel Five US. Its first episode was shown on 18 February 2009.  The show is also streamed in Australia on 7Plus

References

External links
 The Beast at AETV.com
 
 

2009 American television series debuts
2009 American television series endings
2000s American crime drama television series
American action television series
A&E (TV network) original programming
English-language television shows
Television series about the Federal Bureau of Investigation
Television series by Sony Pictures Television
Television shows filmed in Illinois
Television shows set in Chicago